Dereköy is a village in the District of Yenipazar, Aydın Province, Turkey. As of 2010, it had a population of 499 people.

References

Villages in Yenipazar District